Karimpat Mathangi Ramakrishnan is an Indian pediatric plastic surgeon and a former head of the department of Burns, Plastic and Reconstructive Surgery at the Kilpauk Medical College, Chennai. Post retirement from the medical college, she joined Kanchi Kamakoti Childs Trust Hospital, Chennai and is the incumbent the head of the Paediatric Intensive Burn Care Unit and Plastic Surgery of the institution.

Mathangi Ramakrishnan is credited with several medical papers published in peer reviewed medical journals. She is a recipient of Sushruta Gold Medal from the Sushruta Society of India, Hari Om Ashram Award from the Association of Surgeons of India and the Lifetime achievement award of the National Academy of Burns India. She was honored by the Government of India, in 2002, with the fourth highest Indian civilian award of Padma Shri.

See also

 Plastic Surgery

References

External links
 
 
 

Recipients of the Padma Shri in medicine
Medical doctors from Tamil Nadu
Living people
Indian plastic surgeons
Indian paediatricians
Indian medical academics
20th-century Indian medical doctors
Year of birth missing (living people)
20th-century surgeons